Sue Boldra (September 9, 1949) is a former member of the Kansas House of Representatives.

Biography
Boldra was born in McPherson County, Kansas. She graduated from high school in Canton, Kansas, as well as McPherson College and Fort Hays State University.

Career
Boldra was a member of the Kansas House of Representatives from 2013 to 2017. She was defeated in the general election on November 8, 2016 by Democratic candidate Eber Phelps. She is a Republican and lives in Hays.

References

External links
Vote Smart Sue Boldra

People from McPherson County, Kansas
Republican Party members of the Kansas House of Representatives
Women state legislators in Kansas
Fort Hays State University alumni
Living people
McPherson College alumni
21st-century American politicians
21st-century American women politicians
People from Hays, Kansas
1949 births